Ophryotrocha magnadentata is a species of polychaete worm, first found on deep sea whale fall and wood fall habitats in the north-east Pacific, off the southern Californian coast. This species and Ophryotrocha longicollaris are sister species; together with O. nauarchus and O. flabella, it falls in a clade including O. globopalpata and Exallopus jumarsi from the shallow North Atlantic.

References

Further reading
Ravara, Ascensão, et al. "First account on the diversity of Ophryotrocha (Annelida, Dorvilleidae) from a mammal-fall in the deep-Atlantic Ocean with the description of three new species." Systematics and Biodiversity 13.6 (2015): 555-570.
Wiklund, Helena. Evolution of annelid diversity at whale-falls and other marine ephemeral habitats. 2009.

External links

WORMS

Polychaetes